Billy Wood (31 August 1905 – 14 November 1975) was a former Australian rules footballer who played with Carlton in the Victorian Football League (VFL).

Notes

External links 

Billy Wood's profile at Blueseum

1905 births
1975 deaths
Carlton Football Club players
Australian rules footballers from Victoria (Australia)
Northcote Football Club players